Bowen Lake is a lake in Alberta, Canada.

Bowen Lake has the name of R. E. Bowen, an officer in World War I.

See also
List of lakes of Alberta

References

Lakes of Alberta